Word of Mouth is the twenty-first studio album by the English rock group the Kinks. "Do It Again" was released as a single from the album in 1985.

Information
The track "Living on a Thin Line" by Dave Davies was played three times in the 2001 episode "University" of the American TV show The Sopranos. According to producer Terence Winter on the DVD extras, it is the series' most asked-about song. The song was also played in the final episode of the HBO series Vice Principals.

The song "Good Day" includes an allusion to the death of actress Diana Dors.

The song "Do It Again" was featured in the film Click (released in 2006), and in trailers that were promoting the film. It was also used in TV ad promotions for the 2013 edition of the Tour de France.

Three tracks ("Going Solo", "Missing Persons", and "Sold Me Out") were repurposed for Kinks leader Ray Davies' solo debut album, the soundtrack to his concurrently produced, self-directed film, Return to Waterloo.

Commercial performance
The album spent twenty weeks on the US Billboard album charts and reached its peak position of No. 57 in February 1985.

Track listing

Personnel
The Kinks
Ray Davies – guitar, keyboards, harmonica, vocals, drum machine on "Good Day", "Do It Again" and "Living on a Thin Line"
Dave Davies – guitar, background vocals, lead vocals on "Guilty" and "Living on a Thin Line"
Jim Rodford – bass, background vocals
Bob Henrit – drums, percussion except on "Missing Persons", "Sold Me Out" and "Going Solo"
Mick Avory – drums, percussion on "Missing Persons", "Sold Me Out" and "Going Solo"
Ian Gibbons – keyboards, background vocals

Additional personnel
David Baker – engineer
Donn Davenport – art direction
Chris Morton – concept
Maude Gilman, Howard Fritzson – design
Renate Stürmer – illustration

Notes

External links

1984 albums
The Kinks albums
Arista Records albums
Albums produced by Ray Davies